Bikini Barbershop (Also known as Bikini Barbershop: Jersey) is an American reality show which originally ran on AXS TV during 2012. It features Jeff Wulkan, a man who runs a hair salon/barber shop in Long Branch, New Jersey called "Bikini Barbers". It mainly consists of female hair stylists, at work, wearing only bikinis. Following Hurricane Sandy, a drop in business forced the closure of the shop.

Main characters
Jeff – The owner and CEO of Bikini Barbers. Although he is unfair to his workers and massively sexist, he is extremely focused and single minded. This extends to other aspects of his life including his relentless, and at times, cringe-worthy pursuit of the opposite sex. However he has a clear desire for business success and is very ambitious.
Ariana – Manager/Hair Stylist. The show focuses a lot on her conflict with Jeff. Ariana, although she comes across as rude and obnoxious at times, is strong and independent. However, Jeff finds her all round attitude highly distasteful. Their constant clashing forms the centerpiece of the show.
Natalie - Hair Stylist. Attractive and likeable, she is Jeff's favorite employee for her agreeable nature and aesthetic qualities.
Alissa - Hair Stylist. Some what "ditzy" but attractive to look at and inoffensive in nature. She undergoes a breast augmentation procedure during one of the shows.
Lauren - Hair Stylist. Also undergoes a breast augmentation during the series.
Kim - Hair Stylist.

Episodes

References

External links
Bikini Barbers official website

2012 American television series debuts
2010s American reality television series
Television shows set in New Jersey
Television shows filmed in New Jersey
English-language television shows
2012 American television series endings